Hoey is a hamlet in the Canadian province of Saskatchewan in the rural municipality of St. Louis No. 431, Saskatchewan.

Demographics 

References

Designated places in Saskatchewan
Organized hamlets in Saskatchewan
St. Louis No. 431, Saskatchewan
Division No. 15, Saskatchewan